The Confederation of New Trade Unions of Slovenia "Independence" (KNSS "Independence") is a national trade union center in Slovenia. It was founded in March 1990.

References

External links
  KNSS "Independence" official site.

Trade unions in Slovenia
Trade unions established in 1990